Palea Kameni, also known as Palia Kameni, is a volcanic island within the Santorini Caldera. The island was formed by a series of volcanic eruptions that formed large deposits of pumice and dacite. The island's name translates to "Old Burnt Island".
This Island is in the west of the Greek coast and is private territorium. It wasn't inhabited for 15000 years until it was bought in 1899 and sold in 1975. It is available for tourists though. The owners build various hotels and made multiple beaches public.

History 
Palea Kameni was formed by a series of eruptions between 197 BCE and 47 CE. The appearance of the island was first noted in the journal of Roman scientist Cassius Dio, who wrote "This year [47 CE] a small islet, hitherto unknown, made an appearance close to the island of Thera." The island was gradually built up by further volcanic activity, though outright eruptions ceased by the end of the 1st century CE. No signs of activity were reported on the island until 726, when the island suffered an explosive eruption of pumice. Volcanic activity then ceased again until the 1500s, when the development of Palea's sister island Nea Kameni caused increased volcanic activity to be reported. Other ancient authors note that it arose from the sea in 197 BCE and was given the name Hiera, a name frequently given in antiquity to volcanic mountains. This fact is stated by Eusebius, Justin, Strabo, and Plutarch.

The island lies to the southwest of Nea Kameni. Though the island is for the most part uninhabited, several structures (including a small church) are located on the island. Due to a lack of good harbors, most recreational watercraft do not stop at the island, though tourists can swim to the island from nearby Nea Kameni. Like the larger island to its east, Palea Kameni is sparsely vegetated with succulent plants. A herd of goats is present on the island, as is a single inhabitant, Sostice Arvanitis. The island also contains a hot spring.

References 

Santorini
Volcanoes of Greece
Volcanoes of the Aegean
Uninhabited islands of Greece
Landforms of Thira (regional unit)
Islands of the South Aegean
Islands of Greece
197 BC